The Department of Trade, Industry and Competition (also known as the dtic; before June 2019 the Department of Trade and Industry or the dti) is the department of the South African government with responsibility for commercial policy and industrial policy. The dti and its subsidiary agencies are involved in promoting economic development, Black Economic Empowerment, implementing commercial law (including companies law and intellectual property law), promoting and regulating international trade, and consumer protection.

The political head of the department is the Minister of Trade and Industry, who is assisted by a Deputy Minister. , the minister is Rob Davies and the deputy minister is Mzwandile Masina. The executive head of the department is the Director-General of Trade and Industry; as of 21 April 2011 this is Lionel October.

In the 2010 national budget, the department received an appropriation of 6,150.1 million rand, and had 1,140 employees.

Subsidiary agencies
The dti Group includes various subordinate agencies which perform specific functions. These agencies are classified in three "clusters", as follows.

Development Finance and Small Business Development Institutions 
 Export Credit Insurance Corporation (ECIC)
 National Empowerment Fund (NEF)

Regulatory Institutions
 Companies and Intellectual Property Commission (CIPC)
 Companies Tribunal (CT)
 National Consumer Tribunal (NCT)
 National Credit Regulator (NCR)
 National Gambling Board (NGB)
 National Lotteries Commission (NLC)
 National Consumer Commission (NCC)

Standardisation, Quality Assurance, Accreditation and Metrology Institutions 
 National Regulator for Compulsory Specifications (NRCS)
 South African National Accreditation Systems (SANAS)
 South African Bureau of Standards (SABS) 
 National Metrology Institute of South Africa (NMISA)

See also
 Commerce minister

References

External links
 

Trade, Industry and Competition
South Africa
South Africa
Economy of South Africa